Caladenia behrii, commonly known as pink-lipped spider orchid is a plant in the orchid family Orchidaceae and is endemic to South Australia. It has a single narrow, hairy leaf and one or two creamy-white flowers with pink tips in early spring.

Description
The petals and sepals spread widely at their bases but have drooping, thread-like ends. The labellum has a fringed edge and there are between four and six rows of red calli along its mid-line. Flowering occurs in August and September and is followed by an oblong-shaped capsule which releases hundreds of seeds in late October or November.

Taxonomy and naming
Caladenia behrii was first formally described by Diederich Schlechtendal in 1847 and the description was published in Linnaea: ein Journal für die Botanik in ihrem ganzen Umfange, oder Beiträge zur Pflanzenkunde. The specific epithet honours the German-American botanist, Hans Hermann Behr.

Distribution and habitat
This caladenia occurs in two small disjunct populations, one near Kersbrook and Williamstown and the other near Belair and Clarendon. It grows on loamy soils in woodland.

Ecology
As with many other caladenias. the pink-lipped spider orchid is pollinated by male thynnid wasps when they attempt to copulate with the labellum. Since the orchid is an endangered species, hand pollination may be used to propagate the species artificially. Research has shown that cross pollination and pollination with a single pollinium increase the number and viability of seeds produced. Unlike for some other species, fire does not induce or increase the flowering of C. behrii.

Conservation
Caladenia behrii is classified as "Endangered" under the Government of South Australia National Parks and Wildlife Act of 1972 and the Australian Government Environment Protection and Biodiversity Conservation Act 1999 (EPBC Act).

References

behrii
Plants described in 1847
Endemic orchids of Australia
Orchids of South Australia